Like Water for Chocolate is the fourth studio album by American rapper Common, released on March 28, 2000, through MCA Records. It was Common's first major label album and was both a critical and commercial breakthrough, receiving widespread acclaim from major magazine publications and selling 70,000 copies in its first week. The album was certified Gold on August 11, 2000, by the Recording Industry Association of America. According to Nielsen SoundScan, the album had sold 748,000 copies by March 2005. The video for "The Light" was frequently shown on MTV, adding to Common's exposure. This group of musicians would also be featured on Common's next album, Electric Circus.

The album's cover photo, 1956 Alabama by Gordon Parks, is a photo of a young black woman in Alabama, dressed for church, and drinking from a "Colored Only" drinking fountain.

Conception

Background
Following 1997's One Day It'll All Make Sense, Common moved to New York City where he began collaborating with the Soulquarians at Electric Lady Studios. It was there that Ahmir Thompson (?uestlove) who oversaw the album's production, introduced Common to D'Angelo. Thompson had been doing a great deal of producing there with several members of the Soulquarians, including D'Angelo. The track "Geto Heaven Part Two" was originally supposed to be a track on D'Angelo's 2000 album Voodoo, but was traded for "Chicken Grease," a track which Common had intended to include on Like Water for Chocolate. Questlove on "Chicken Grease":

Title significance
The title Like Water for Chocolate comes from the 1989 Laura Esquivel novel Like Water for Chocolate, which was adapted into the movie of the same name in 1992. The phrase "Like water for chocolate" is of Spanish origin (translated, como agua para chocolate). In many Latin American countries, hot chocolate is made with water rather than milk. The phrase refers to someone who has reached their boiling point, like water ready to be used to make chocolate. In an interview with Combustible the Poet, Common compared the main character Tita de la Garza's passion for food with his passion for music:

In an interview on MTV, Common added:

Another popular interpretation of the album title ties in the phrase with the image on the cover of the album.  Using the word 'chocolate' to symbolise people of dark skin color and the words 'like water' to describe the racially provocative concept of providing drinking water of exactly the same likeness for two different races alludes to the famous image and the themes of race that are found within the lyrical content of the album.

Music
Like Water for Chocolate is notable for its Afrocentric themes. It borrows from the Afrobeat genre on the track "Time Travelin' (A Tribute To Fela)", the Tony Allen-sampling "Heat" and the Slum Village-assisted "Nag Champa (Afrodisiac For The World)". MC Lyte and Mos Def join Common for the amusing "A Film Called (Pimp)" and "The Questions," respectively. In the former, Common sends up his own "conscious" image with a skit depicting him as a hypocritical woman-beater.

Like Common's previous two albums, Like Water for Chocolate closes with spoken word recited by Common's father Lonnie "Pops" Lynn. A slightly altered version of the album was released after its success on the charts, with the Macy Gray-assisted "Geto Heaven Remix T.S.O.I. (The Sound of Illadelph)" replacing the original.

As of 2011, the musical interludes on tracks such as "A Film Called Pimp" and "Time Travelling" have been removed from all online versions of the album, possibly due to unconfirmed sample-clearing issues.

Lyrical content
Like previous albums from Common, the subject matter discussed in Like Water for Chocolate is of a socially conscious nature. Typically, conscious hip hop's greatest following is underground, and conscious hip hop artists do not achieve great mainstream success. Yet despite being Common's first commercially successful album, Like Water for Chocolate maintains the same level of concern and social responsibility that had previously been seen in Common's first three albums. The album contains significant afrocentric elements which are particularly evident on "Time Travelin' (A Tribute to Fela)" and "Time Travelin' (Reprise)." Both tracks discuss the ills of modern society and are a tribute to Fela Kuti, a pioneer of Afrobeat music and a prominent human rights activist, with "Time Travelin' (Reprise) featuring Kuti's son, Femi Kuti. Track 2, "Heat" samples Tony Allen, Fela Kuti's one-time fellow band member and co-founder of the Afrobeat genre.

Also unique are "Payback is a Grandmother" and "A Song for Assata."  "Payback is a Grandmother" is a continuation of the series of "Stolen Moment" songs that appeared on One Day It'll All Make Sense, whereby Common weaves a fictional tale in which he pursues a thief (on this occasion the thugs who have robbed his grandmother). Amidst the intricate caper, the song emphasizes the importance of family values. As Common says in the song's intro "I don't know what was on y'all niggaz birds to go up to the boat—and start robbin old folks". The song ends in a skit involving police officers at the scene of a crime where, breaking out of character, one of the officers can be heard saying "the skit definitely needs more added to it ... Someone get Prince Paul on the phone please"—the last remark recognizing Prince Paul's reputation as a pioneer of the album skit.

"A Song for Assata" chronicles the arrest, trial, incarceration and Cuban political asylum of Assata Shakur (a member of the Black Panther Party, after whom Common named his daughter, Omoye Assata Lynn). The spoken-word piece at the end of the track is a quote from Assata Shakur. During the album's creation, Common traveled to Havana, Cuba, where he met and talked with Shakur. The excerpt used details Shakur's thoughts on what freedom is and what it means to be free.  As she notes:

I know a whole more about what freedom isn't
Than about what it is, cause I've never been free.
I can only share my vision with you of the future, about what freedom is.

Working as both a battle song and self-reflection, the sensuous "Nag Champa (Afrodisiac for the World)" sees Common proclaiming himself "The Earth, Wind, and Fire of hip hop" while admitting "By Rakim and Short I been inspired"—a comment which compounds the two very contrasting rap artists. Common goes on to note:

The mind is funny, how it's spent on gettin' it [money]
I'm sittin wit descendants of Abraham
Who say the jam is "Money, Cash, Hoes"

"Nag Champa" is one of the rare occurrences in which Common's frequent collaborator, producer J Dilla, takes on the role of singer. Common later explained:

Production
Although Questlove was the album's executive producer, a large deal of the production work was handled by Jay Dee (aka J Dilla) of Slum Village and The Ummah. Common and Jay Dee both hailed from the Great Lakes region (Jay Dee from Detroit and Common from Chicago) and were good friends. The track "Thelonius" was even placed on both Like Water for Chocolate and Slum Village's 2000 release Fantastic, Vol. 2.

Common also wanted to work with DJ Premier, citing Gang Starr as one of his favorite groups to listen to. In an interview with New Jeru Poet, Common described his motivation to work with DJ Premier:

Reception

Like Water for Chocolate received widespread acclaim from music critics. Rolling Stones Kris Ex called Common "a hip-hop MC willing to actually examine himself through his art". NMEs Stevie Chick described him as a "great storyteller" who is "equal parts philosopher and documentarian." Spins Peter S. Scholtes praised Like Water for Chocolate as "his most aggressive and powerful record yet", and The Wire also hailed it as his best album. The Source wrote that the album finds "a more worldly Common ... creating full-fledged jazz, funk and soul songs". In Mojo, Andy Gill called Like Water for Chocolate the "most user-friendly contribution so far to the wave of 'conscious' rap." RapReviews critic Steve "Flash" Juon wrote: "From 'Payback is a Grandmother' all the way to the finale 'Pop's Rap III' you'll find your ears have been smothered in a sweet darkness that Dove has never been able to wrap in foil and sell for ninety-nine cents. You may in fact be coming down off a hip-hop sugar high. Not to worry – just hit random play and any track on this album will give you another fix."

Q described Like Water for Chocolate as "wholemeal hip hop: chewy and a wee bit bland but nutritious all the same." In a mixed review, Sal Cinquemani of Slant Magazine felt that the album "certainly attempts to make change (musically and socially), but part of my disappointment comes from the high expectations that naturally arise when an artist tries to break from the norm", concluding that "maybe if there were more hip-hop artists like him, the burden wouldn't be placed solely on one rapper's shoulders."

In 2004, PopMatters Marc Lamont Hill named the album his personal favorite, writing:

The music online magazine Pitchfork placed Like Water for Chocolate at number 169 on their list of top 200 albums of the 2000s.

The album's hit single, "The Light" received a 2001 Grammy Award nomination for Best Rap Solo Performance.

The album was included in the book 1001 Albums You Must Hear Before You Die.

Accolades
Information is taken from AcclaimedMusic.net.

Later albums
Following the success of LWFC, Common continued collaborating with the Soulquarians for his next album, Electric Circus. It featured the Soulquarians more prominently than Like Water for Chocolate, but was not nearly as successful because of its more eclectic vision, and relatively poor promotion from MCA Records. Electric Circus was considered a commercial disappointment, selling just over 200,000 copies, whereas its predecessor sold over twice as many.

Track listing

* Track listing and production credits are taken from the album's liner notes.

Charts

Weekly charts

Year-end charts

Singles

Certifications

References

External links
 Ready for the Majors at Los Angeles Times

2000 albums
Common (rapper) albums
Albums produced by DJ Premier
Albums produced by J Dilla
Albums produced by Questlove
MCA Records albums
Albums recorded at Electric Lady Studios